Sonia, Sonja or Sonya, a name of Greek origin meaning wisdom, may refer to:

People 

 Sonia (name), a feminine given name (lists people named, Sonia, Sonja and Sonya)

 Sonia (actress), Indian film actress in Malayalam and Tamil films
 Sonia (singer), British pop singer Sonia Evans
 Sonia, pen name of Ottavia Vitagliano (1894–1975), an Italian writer
 Sonia, code-name of Ursula Kuczynski, also known as Beurton, a spy for the USSR
Queen Sonja of Norway
Sonia Ben Ammar, French fashion model, actress and singer known mononymously as SONIA
 Sonia people, an ethnic group on the Great Papuan Plateau of Papua New Guinea

Other 

 Sonia, the allied code name for the Mitsubishi Ki-51, Japanese WW2 era bomber 
 SONIA, Sterling OverNight Index Average, a financial market rate
 Sonia (album), a 1991 album by Sonia Evans
 Sonia (film), a 1921 British silent film
 Sonja (film), a 1943 Swedish directed by Hampe Faustman
 Sonia (genus), a genus of moths
 M/V Sonia, a passenger ferry